Stephen Grellet (28 October 1772 – 16 November 1855) was a prominent French-American Quaker missionary.

Life

was born Étienne de Grellet du Mabillier in Limoges, France, the son of Antoine Gabriel Grellet, a counsellor of King Louis XVI who was also director of the first chinaware factory in Limoges. His family had some interest in iron making. Raised as a Roman Catholic, he was educated at the Military College of Lyons, now the Institut d'études politiques de Lyon, and at the age of 17 he entered the personal guard of the king. During the French Revolution he was sentenced to be executed, but escaped and eventually fled Europe to Demerara in South America with his brother Joseph in 1793, then to the United States in 1795. There he met Deborah Darby, an English Quaker minister who had been in the U.S. since August 1793. Darby made a big impression on Grellet and under her and William Savery's influence he decided to join the Quakers (Society of Friends). Darby and Grellet became friends and when Darby returned to Britain with her colleague Rebecca Young she was accompanied by four American Quakers (including William Savery) and her friend Stephen Grellet was there to wave them off. 

Grellet became involved in extensive missionary work in prisons and hospitals across North America and most of the countries of Europe, and was granted meetings with many rulers and dignitaries, including Pope Pius VII, Tsar Alexander I, and the Kings of Spain and Prussia. He encouraged many reforms in educational policies and in hospital and prison conditions.

In 1804 Grellet married Rebecca Collins, the daughter of the publisher Isaac Collins. The family home, the Isaac Collins House, in Burlington, New Jersey, is now listed on the National Register of Historic Places.

Grellet died in Burlington on 16 November 1855 and his body was buried there, behind the Quaker Meeting House at 340 High Street.

Bibliography
Benjamin Seebohm: Memoirs of the life and gospel labours of Stephen Grellet, Longstreth, Philadelphia, 1862 (3rd ed.), 426+438 p.
Frances Anne Budge : A missionary life : Stephen Grellet, Nisbet, London, 1888, 127 p.
William Guest : Stephen Grellet, Headley, London, 1903, 226 p.
William Wistar Comfort, 'Stephen Grellet, 1773-1855', MacMillan, New York, 1942, 202p.

References

External links

1773 births
1855 deaths
People from Limoges
People of the French Revolution
French emigrants to the United States
Converts to Quakerism from Roman Catholicism
French Protestant missionaries
French Quakers
Quaker missionaries
Burials in New Jersey
Protestant missionaries in Canada
Protestant missionaries in the United States
Protestant missionaries in Europe
18th-century Quakers
19th-century Quakers